Hootin' the Blues is a live album by the blues musician Lightnin' Hopkins, recorded in Philadelphia in 1962 and released on the Prestige Folklore label in 1964.

Reception

The Penguin Guide to Blues Recordings wrote that "this set gives an accurate idea of the repertoire Lightnin' tended to choose when playing for folkclub audiences". AllMusic reviewer Bruce Eder stated: "Hootin' The Blues is one of Hopkins' better folk club concerts, capturing him in an intense performance on acoustic guitar, rapping (in the sense of talking) about the blues and what it means as he introduces some powerful songs ... The best moment, though, is his reinvention of Ray Charles' 'What'd I Say' as an acoustic guitar number (trust me, it works), which displays the kind of fingering that must've made a young Eric Clapton want to sit down and cry".

Track listing
All compositions by Sam "Lightnin'" Hopkins except where noted
 "Blues Is a Feeling" – 8:00
 "Me and Ray Charles" – 3:35
 "In the Evening (When the Sun Goes Down)" (Leroy Carr, Don Raye) – 3:21
 "Ain't It Crazy" – 2:26
 "Last Night I Lost the Best Friend I Ever Had" – 4:33
 "Everything" – 2:58
 "I Work Down on the Chain Gang" – 5:10
 "Meet Me in the Bottom" – 2:27

Personnel

Performance
Lightnin' Hopkins – guitar, vocals

Production
 Shel Kagan – supervision
 Esmond Edwards – engineer

References

Lightnin' Hopkins live albums
1964 live albums
Prestige Records live albums